Marta Heflin  (March 29, 1945 – September 18, 2013) was an American actress who appeared in several Robert Altman films, including Come Back to the Five and Dime, Jimmy Dean, Jimmy Dean and A Perfect Couple. Known for her waifish appearance, Heflin also acted in various New York stage musicals prior to her film career, such as Fiddler on the Roof, Hair, and Jesus Christ Superstar.

Marta was the daughter of American theatre producer and journalist Julia Heflin and public relations executive Martin Heflin. She was the niece of Oscar-winning actor Van Heflin and actress Frances Heflin.

After struggling with prolonged illness, Heflin died in Manhattan at the age of 68. In 2014, the Marta Heflin Foundation, a private grant-making foundation that supports the work of other charitable organizations, was set up as part of her legacy.

Film career 
After appearing in a number of stage musicals in New York in the 1960s and 70s, Heflin made her transition to the small screen in the soap opera The Doctors. Next came a supporting role as Quentin in Frank Pierson's 1976 remake of A Star Is Born, starring Barbra Streisand and Kris Kristofferson. After working with director Robert Altman in the comedy of manners A Wedding (1978), Heflin was handpicked to replace actress Sandy Dennis in the role of Sheila Shea, a rock singer who dates an older Greek-American businessman after meeting him through a videotape computer dating service, in Altman's film A Perfect Couple (1979).

In the 1980s, Heflin appeared in two TV movies: Playing for Time (1980), a drama set in a concentration camp starring Vanessa Redgrave, and The Gentleman Bandit (1981), which followed a priest falsely accused of a string of armed robberies. In 1982, Heflin reunited with Altman for the Broadway production of Ed Graczyk's play Come Back to the Five and Dime, in which she played Edna Louise, a member of an all-female fan club named the Disciples of James Dean. She reprised the role in Altman's film adaptation of the play later that year.

Legacy 
In 2014, the Marta Heflin Foundation was established to support the work of other charitable organizations. Heflin's private Foundation has since awarded PAWS NY with a $10,000 grant for its Foster and Emergency Care Program, which provides care for pets whose guardians are facing health emergencies of their own.

Filmography

References

External links

1945 births
2013 deaths
American film actresses
Actresses from Washington, D.C.
21st-century American women